Alvin is a national technical platform for the dissemination and long term preservation of digitised cultural heritage and digital collections in Sweden. The platform contains material from several Swedish cultural heritage organisations, and is operated and developed at Uppsala University Library in collaboration with Gothenburg University Library and Lund University Library through the Alvin consortium.

History 

Alvin as a system originated from several different projects that Uppsala University Library ran or participated in during a period between 2000-2014:

 Creating a database to handle  Erik Waller's extensive autograph collection
 The management of the university library's digitized map and image collections through the image database Bildsök (sv. "Image Search")
 The provenance and material bibliographic database ProBok, which was a collaboration between Uppsala University Library and the University Library at Lund University
 The archive and handwriting infrastructure Ediffah, where several different Swedish research libraries collaborated

These differing and technically diverse projects made it obvious to those involved that the management, operation and further development of these projects were both person-dependent and unsustainable in a long-term perspective. Something needed to be done to increase the coordination of the cultural heritage field, to get the systems to talk to each other, and to give the organisations involved the time and opportunity to update outdated technology in pace with technological progress.

The concept that then came to be Alvin was formulated in 2011 in a final report for the project LUPP. In order to remedy the person-dependence and to prevent services from losing their technical relevance over time, a common platform should be launched.

The basic technical development of Alvin took place between 2012 and 2014 during the infrastructure project ArkA-D. Finally, this project culminated in Alvin being launched at the conference Digitalisera - men sen då? (sv. "Digitise - but then what?"),  at the Nordic Museum November 28, 2014.

References

Citations

Bibliography 
 "About Alvin". info.alvin-portal.org/about-alvin/about-alvin/. Accessed June 24, 2020.
 "Background and history". wiki.epc.ub.uu.se/display/alvininfo. Accessed June 24, 2020.

External links 
 
 Alvin wiki

Cultural heritage of Sweden
Swedish digital libraries